The 2012 I Marbella Open was a professional tennis tournament played on clay courts. It was the first edition of the tournament which was part of the 2012 ATP Challenger Tour. It took place in Marbella, Spain between 12 and 18 November 2012.

Singles main draw entrants

Seeds

 1 Rankings are as of November 5, 2012.

Other entrants
The following players received wildcards into the singles main draw:
  Manuel de Luis
  Marko Djokovic
  Carlos Gómez-Herrera
  Mario Vilella

The following players received entry from the qualifying draw:
  Roberto Carballés Baena
  David Pérez Sanz
  Blaž Rola
  Jordi Samper-Montaña

Champions

Singles

 Albert Montañés def.  Daniel Muñoz de la Nava, 3–6, 6–2, 6–3

Doubles

 Andrey Kuznetsov /  Javier Martí def.  Emilio Benfele Álvarez /  Adelchi Virgili, 6–3, 6–3

External links
Official Website